Jean-Marie Tjibaou (January 30, 1936 – May 4, 1989) was a French politician in New Caledonia and leader of the Kanak independence movement. The son of a tribal chief, Tjibaou was ordained a Catholic priest but abandoned his religious vocation for a life in political activism.

During the 1970s, he undertook a thesis in ethnology at the Sorbonne. While he did not complete his studies, he became engaged in cultural and ethnicity issues on New Caledonia. In 1975 he arranged the Melanesia 2000 festival, which emphasized the Kanak identity.

He was appointed mayor of Hienghène in 1977 and, in 1979, he was made territorial councillor in the newly formed Independence Front, and the head of the pro-independence Kanak and Socialist National Liberation Front in 1984.

A cultural leader in the promotion of the indigenous Kanak culture, Wéa was shot dead by Tjibaou's bodyguards after the attack. Witnesses said other gunmen were involved. the modern Jean-Marie Tjibaou Cultural Centre, designed by Italian architect Renzo Piano, is named in his honour.

See also 

 List of peace activists

References

http://www.adck.nc/

1936 births
1989 deaths
Assassinated New Caledonian politicians
Assassinated French politicians
Mayors of places in New Caledonia
New Caledonian writers
Laicized Roman Catholic priests
Kanak people
University of Paris alumni
École pratique des hautes études alumni
People from North Province, New Caledonia